Iron Mountain, located in Napa County, California, is approximately 2 miles from the western shore of Lake Berryessa.

References 

Mountains of Napa County, California
Mountains of the San Francisco Bay Area
Mountains of Northern California